HITZ FM is a privately owned and a commercial radio station in Accra, the capital of Ghana. The station is owned and run by the media group company Multimedia Group Limited.

They are one of the top radio stations in Ghana who are well vested in local news, entertainment, political talk shows, and sports. They have so many sister stations that are also owned by Multimedia Group Limited. They include Adom FM, Joy FM (Ghana), Asempa FM, Nhyira FM, and Luv FM. corresponds to all these sister radio stations 24/7.

The station also plays a mix of contemporary local and foreign music interlaced with entertainment tidbits.

Staff 

 Mark Okraku-Mantey - Programmes Manager

References

Radio stations in Ghana
Greater Accra Region
Mass media in Accra